Sambhaji Shahaji Bhosle  (1623–1655) was the elder son of Shahaji and Jijabai. He was the elder brother of Shivaji. At the time of Sambhaji's birth, Shahaji was a general in the court of Nizamshahi. Sambhaji was killed in an assault on Kanakagiri by Afzal Khan.

References 

1623 births
1648 deaths
Shivaji
Indian royalty